Elections to Lewisham London Borough Council were held in May 1974.  The whole council was up for election. Turnout was 33.8%. This election had aldermen as well as councillors. Labour got all ten aldermen.

Election result

|}

Ward results

References

1974
1974 London Borough council elections